The Waini River is a river in the Barima-Waini region of northern Guyana. It flows into the Atlantic Ocean near the border with Venezuela. The upper portion of the river flows through the Guianian moist forests, while the lower Waini river flows through the eastern extent of the vast Orinoco Delta swamp forests before emptying into the sea.

Features 
Almond Beach at the mouth of the Waini River is one of the most important nesting areas for leatherback, green, hawksbill and the olive ridley marine turtles. It is the only place in Guyana that has a large stretch of intact mangrove forest, brackish water and coastal swamp communities.

There are three significant waterfalls along the Waini.

Settlements along the river include Santa Cruz and Santa Rosa, an Amerindian community.

See also
List of rivers of Guyana
List of rivers of the Americas by coastline

References

Rivers of Guyana
Barima-Waini